"Face Everything and Rise" is a song by the American rock band Papa Roach. It served as the lead single from the band's seventh studio album F.E.A.R.. The song was released on November 4, 2014, and reached number one on the Mainstream Rock Tracks chart.

Music video
A music video was released for the song on YouTube on November 4, 2014.

Chart performance

References

2014 singles
2014 songs
Papa Roach songs
Songs written by Kevin Churko
Songs written by Jacoby Shaddix
Songs written by Tobin Esperance
Eleven Seven Label Group singles
Electronic rock songs